The 13th South American Youth Championships in Athletics were held in Asunción, Paraguay from October 18–20, 1996.

Medal summary
Medal winners are published for boys and girls.  Complete results can be found on the "World Junior Athletics History" website.

Men

Women

Medal table (unofficial)

Participation (unofficial)
Detailed result lists can be found on the "World Junior Athletics History" website.  An unofficial count yields the number of about 268 athletes from about 10 countries:  

 (49)
 (14)
 (57)
 (45)
 (21)
 (11)
 (26)
 Peru (9)
 (28)
 (8)

References

External links
World Junior Athletics History

South American U18 Championships in Athletics
1996 in Paraguayan sport
South American U18 Championships
International athletics competitions hosted by Paraguay
1996 in youth sport
Sports competitions in Asunción
October 1996 sports events in South America
1990s in Asunción